is a fighting video game developed and published by Nintendo in 1984. It was first released for the Famicom and Nintendo VS. System for arcades in 1984, and later released for the Nintendo Entertainment System in North America and Europe in 1986. It was inspired by the 1984 Game & Watch game Boxing (also known as Punch-Out!!). It is Nintendo's first 2D fighting game, eventually followed in 1993 by Joy Mech Fight, released exclusively in Japan for the Famicom.

Gameplay

The objective is to knock the other player into a sewer manhole. There is a 99-second time limit, and the player has a set limit of stamina (200 hit points). The player has two types of attacks: a light punch and a heavy punch. The light punch is weaker but faster and harder to block, while the heavy punch is stronger, but takes longer to pull off, is more easily telegraphed, and is thus easier to block.

Each punch costs the player 1 HP. Flower pots are occasionally dropped from windows, which will cost a fighter 5 HP and daze the fighter if they hit. When a player is knocked off the pavement, they advance to the next street. After every third fight, the opponent is knocked into a manhole, then the player has a brief celebration where a lady throws confetti from a window. The goal of the game is to reach the rank of Champion. Every three fights won, the player gets a specific symbol on the lower right corner; after five symbols are earned, they go to the next set of symbols. After 45 symbols (135 fights), they get the rank of Champion. In addition, a police car may pass by the fighting at any point in the fight which causes the players to return to their starting positions. If the timer runs out, the police will arrest the player closest to being knocked off of the pavement, meaning it is a default win for the other player for that round.

Release
Urban Champion was first released in Japan on November 14, 1984, for the Family Computer. It was an adaptation of the Game & Watch video game called Boxing. It was released in the arcades as Vs. Urban Champion in 1985. It was later released in North America in August 1986 for the Nintendo Entertainment System, and in Europe some time in 1986. Urban Champion was re-released for the Nintendo e-Reader, and then later on the Virtual Console for the Wii and the Wii U. Urban Champion was later slightly altered in autostereoscopic 3D by Arika and released by Nintendo on the Nintendo 3DS as a downloadable game in the 3D Classics series on July 13, 2011, in Japan and the rest of the world on August 18, 2011. This release was featured among other games from the Nintendo Entertainment System and Super Nintendo Entertainment System to be released for the 3DS on a tech demo called Classic Games at E3 2010.

Reception
Most reviews gave it negative ratings. In the special edition Pak Source included on the January/February 1990 volume of Nintendo Power, which rated all the NES games released in North America from October 1985 to March 1990, Urban Champion received (out of 5) scores of 2.5, 2.5, 1.5, and 1.5 for the four categories evaluated. Along with Chubby Cherub, it is one of the only two games to obtain a score below 2 in a category. Contemporary reviews upon the game's arrival on the Virtual Console were not better. Levi Buchanan noted it as one of the weakest NES games for the Virtual Console. GameSpot's Jeff Gerstmann called it tedious when it was originally released, and now it's "about as boring as it can possibly be." GamePro described it as a second tier Virtual Console game. 1UP.com's Jeremy Parish commented that he would rather have nothing at all on the Virtual Console in its debut week than Urban Champion. He also cited it as an example of a poor game that gamers would still buy for the e-Reader. He listed it as one of the worst Virtual Console games. 1UP.com's Patrick Klepek criticized Nintendo for releasing only this and Baseball in one week, calling both poor games. Writer Bob Mackey called it questionable, calling it the "Bad Street Brawler of its day". GameSpy's Phil Theobald called it awful, criticizing its cameo in Tetris DS. IGN's Lucas M. Thomas called it too shallow for an NES game, adding that there was no reason to purchase it. He also commented that it didn't deserve the distinction of being Nintendo's first head-to-head fighting game. IGN AU's Cam Shea called it "god awful", and "worse than actually falling down a manhole". Screw Attack advised that Wii owners not waste their money on it, calling it simple and slow.

However, video game developer Ron Alpert found it to be an acceptable game, calling it one of the simplest of its day, but also an easy game to pick up and play. Since its release, most consumers gave five stars to the 3D Classics version of Urban Champion for the Nintendo 3DS.

References

External links
Urban Champion (Virtual Console) at Nintendo's website

1984 video games
Arcade video games
Nintendo 3DS eShop games
Nintendo arcade games
Nintendo games
Nintendo e-Reader games
Nintendo Entertainment System games
Nintendo Research & Development 1 games
Nintendo Vs. Series games
Fighting games
2D fighting games
Video games developed in Japan
Video games scored by Hirokazu Tanaka
Virtual Console games
Virtual Console games for Wii U